The Killer and The Star is the only album from Cold frontman Scooter Ward's side project The Killer and the Star. It was released July 14, 2009 and had been in the works since 2006 when Cold disbanded. It was originally set to be titled The Series of Emotion.

Track listing

References

2009 debut albums